Ronald M. Anton (born c. 1942) is a Canadian retired curler. He played as third on the Hec Gervais rink that won the 1961 Brier and 1974 Brier.

In 1975 he was inducted into Canadian Curling Hall of Fame.

Anton also coached the 1967 Canadian Schoolboy Championship team.

References

External links

 Ronald Anton – Curling Canada Stats Archive
 
 Video:  (YouTube-channel «Curling Canada»)

1940s births
Living people
Brier champions
Canadian male curlers
Curlers from Alberta
Canadian curling coaches
20th-century Canadian people